Ivailo Gabrovski (born January 31, 1978) is a Bulgarian former racing cyclist. He holds the record for most Tour of Bulgaria wins, which he won 5 times.

Career
Gabrovski was born in Sofia. In April 2012, he won the third stage of the Tour of Turkey. Racing for Turkish Continental team , Gabrovski accelerated 8 kilometers from the finish line in the first mountain top finish stage in the race's history. With that win, he took the leader's jersey, which he held for the rest of the race to take the overall title. Later that year he lost his title since he tested positive for EPO.

Gabrovski speaks French fluently, a skill that he attributes to his beginnings in professional cycling, where he was part of the  team.

Doping
In 2003 he was prevented from racing the 3 Days of West Flanders when he came in over the hematocrit limit. In 2005, he was prevented from riding the world championship in Madrid after failing a blood test conducted by the UCI. He claimed at that time that being an athlete, his body was producing more red blood cells than the average person.

In 2012, Gabrovski tested positive for EPO at that year's Presidential Cycling Tour of Turkey, which he won. He was banned for two years and lost the title. Alexsandr Dyachenko, who had finished second, was awarded the victory.

Major results

2001
 1st  Time trial, National Road Championships
 1st Overall Tour de l'Ain
 2nd Overall Tour du Poitou-Charentes
1st Stage 1
 2nd Gran Premio Città di Camaiore
 3rd Druivenkoers-Overijse
2002
 1st  Road race, National Road Championships
2003
 National Road Championships
1st  Time trial
2nd Road race
 1st Overall Tour of Bulgaria
1st Prologue, Stages 5 & 7
2004
 1st  Time trial, National Road Championships
 1st Overall Tour of Bulgaria
1st Stages 5 & 9
 1st Stage 1 Circuit de Lorraine
2005
 National Road Championships
1st  Time trial
1st  Road race
 1st Overall Tour of Romania
2006
 National Road Championships
1st  Time trial
1st  Road race
 1st Overall Tour of Bulgaria
1st Stages 1, 5b & 8
 1st Overall Tour of Serbia
1st Stages 3 & 6
 3rd Grote Prijs Stad Zottegem
2007
 National Road Championships
1st  Time trial
1st  Road race
 1st Overall Tour of Turkey
1st Stages 3 & 6
 1st Overall Tour de Liège
1st Stage 6
 1st Romsée–Stavelot–Romsée
 1st Stage 3a Tour of Bulgaria
2008
 1st  Time trial, National Road Championships
 1st Overall The Paths of King Nikola
1st Stage 4
 1st Overall Tour of Bulgaria
 1st Stage 3 Tour of Serbia
2009
 National Road Championships
1st  Road race
3rd Time trial
 1st Overall Tour of Bulgaria
1st Stages 1 & 2
 1st Grand Prix of Sharm el-Sheikh
 1st Tour of Vojvodina II
 3rd Overall Tour of Serbia
2011
 1st Overall Tour of Bulgaria
1st Stage 8a
2012
 1st  Overall Tour of Turkey
1st Stage 3
 3rd Overall Tour of Morocco

References

External links

External Images

1978 births
Living people
Sportspeople from Sofia
Bulgarian male cyclists
Doping cases in cycling
Bulgarian sportspeople in doping cases
Presidential Cycling Tour of Turkey winners